The United States Semiquincentennial, also called Sestercentennial or Quarter Millennial and formally The unanimous Declaration of the thirteen united states of America, will be the 250th anniversary of the 1776 United States Declaration of Independence. Festivities will be scheduled to mark various events leading up to the anniversary on July 4, 2026.

Background

The Second Continental Congress voted for the independence of the United Colonies by passing the Lee Resolution on July 2, 1776 in Philadelphia. The Declaration of Independence, mainly written by the Committee of Five, was proclaimed on July 4, the date on which the anniversary of independence is observed.

There were no major government-sponsored semicentennial (50th anniversary) observances in 1826. John Adams and Thomas Jefferson, members of the Committee of Five, both died on July 4, 1826. In 1876, the United States organized nationwide centennial observances centered around the Centennial Exposition in Philadelphia. In 1926, a Sesquicentennial Exposition was held in Philadelphia, and in 1976, Bicentennial observances were held throughout the country.

2026 will mark the United States' semiquincentennial, or 250th anniversary.

Activities and observances

The United States Semiquincentennial Commission Act of 2016 directs the United States Government to issue commemorative coins and postage stamps, and commission appropriately named naval vessels, in advance of the semiquincentennial. In addition, specific activities—both officially organized and independently created—are being planned. The legislation specifically directs the organization of events “in locations of historical significance to the United States" going on to list Boston, Charleston, New York, and Philadelphia as "leading cities."

The Circulating Collectible Coin Redesign Act of 2020 allows the United States Mint to redesign any coins in 2026. It calls for a series of five designs for the quarter, including one depicting women's contributions to independence.

Leading cities

Boston 
In 2016, Revolution 250, a non-profit group organized to plan commemorative events in Boston surrounding the semiquincentennial, was established. According to the organization, it is a consortium of fifty-six groups, including the Society of the Cincinnati, the National Park Service, the Boston Tea Party Museum, the New England Historic Genealogical Society, the Suffolk University history department, the Boston Downtown Business Improvement District, The Bostonian Society, and others.

For the 250th Evacuation Day celebrations, commemorating the evacuation of British forces from the city of Boston following the siege of Boston, early in the American Revolutionary War, on March 17, 2026, the NPS will carry out a $25 million overhaul of the Dorchester Heights Monument. The planned renovations, which will take approximately 18 months to complete, will include work on "taking apart and reassembling the top floors, placing granite slabs to mark where the 1776 fortifications sat, bringing the retaining walls, drainage and lighting up to date and giving the info panels a face lift."

Part of the 2026 FIFA World Cup will be held at the Gillette Stadium in between June and July, co-hosting the championship with 15 other venues between Canada, the United States and Mexico, including the "leading cities" of Philadelphia and New York City, at the Lincoln Financial Field and MetLife Stadium, respectively.

Louisville 
The Sons of the American Revolution (SAR) from its national society headquarters in Louisville, Kentucky announced plans to develop a SAR Education Center and Museum to be opened prior to the 250th Anniversary, which will house galleries and exhibits will highlight the patriot ancestors and tell the story of the American Revolution.

New York City 
Sergio Villavicencio, Vice-President of the Alexander Hamilton Awareness Society, is currently serving as the New York City Semiquincentennial Committee Chair. The Orange County Semiquincentennial Commission was created in 2019, while, in June 2021, the New York State 250th Commemoration Act was enacted, creating a state-wide commission in charge of Semiquincentennial celebrations at the state-level. Part of the 2026 FIFA World Cup will be held at the MetLife Stadium in between June and July, co-hosting the championship with 15 other venues between Canada, the United States and Mexico, including the "leading cities" of Philadelphia and Boston, at the Lincoln Financial Field and Gillette Stadium, respectively.

Philadelphia 
In 2017, the Daughters of the American Revolution announced a grant of $380,000 to the city of Philadelphia to plant 76 semiquincentennial commemorative trees at Independence National Historical Park. The actual planting of the trees will occur over the course of several years leading up to the semiquincentennial. In 2018, at the state-level, the Pennsylvania Commission for the United States Semiquincentennial Commission (A250PA) was formed.

The commission has announced it is preparing a time capsule for burial in Philadelphia on July 4, 2026, which will be scheduled for unearthing on July 4, 2276, the 500th anniversary of the Declaration of Independence.

In 2016, city planners announced "Vision 2026", a plan to redevelop Old City in preparation for the semiquincentennial.

The 96th Major League Baseball All-Star Game will be held at Philadelphia's Citizens Bank Park in mid-July after the semiquincentennial, bookending the 47th All-Star Game held at Philadelphia's Veterans Stadium in 1976 during the bicentennial. Part of the 2026 FIFA World Cup will be held at the Lincoln Financial Field in between June and July, co-hosting the championship with 15 other venues between Canada, the United States and Mexico, including the "leading cities" of Boston and New York City, at the Gillette Stadium and MetLife Stadium, respectively.

Pittsburgh 
In 2019, the city of Pittsburgh organized the "Pittsburgh's United States 250 Celebration", featuring a Freedom train with Black and Gold colors, musical celebrations with the Pittsburgh Orchestra, and a major firework display at Fort Pitt in the city's downtown area, with an all day live parade through all city neighborhoods.

Charleston 
Charleston, SC, chosen due to its past as one of the "locations that witnessed the assertion of American liberty", with the establishment of the South Carolina American Revolution Sestercentennial Commission in 2018, have begun planning battle reenactments and anniversary festivities. These parallel the 2020 celebrations of the College of Charleston's 250th anniversary, as well as the 350th anniversary of the city of Charleston, which was called Charles Town during the Revolutionary War.

Planning

In 2011, the non-profit organization USA250 was established in Philadelphia to lobby for federal government support of the United States semiquincentennial and establish Philadelphia as the host city for events surrounding the semiquincentennial observances. In 2014, the Philadelphia City Council ordered a public hearing of the Committee on Parks, Recreation and Cultural Affairs to investigate "the impact and feasibility of Philadelphia" hosting the United States Semiquincentennial in 2026, among other events.

On November 15, 2017, the United States Department of the Interior issued a request for proposals seeking a non-profit corporation to act as secretariat to the commission and lead nationwide organization of observances. The American Battlefield Trust was named the commission's non-profit partner to serve as Administrative Secretariat, tasked with preparing reports for Congress and helping raise funds for the anniversary observances. The Trust "has distinguished itself in fundraising and managing high-profile commemorative events, and that expertise will be invaluable to the U.S.A. 250th Commemoration planning efforts," said then-Secretary of the Interior Ryan Zinke.

Daniel DiLella, CEO and President of Equus, a leading private equity real estate fund, was appointed Chairperson of the Semiquincentennial Commission in April 2018, leading a 32-member body composed of members of Congress, private citizens and federal officials.

The Commission was tasked with developing a report with recommendations to the President and to Congress within the first two years of formation. The Commission will observe and commemorate not only the Revolution, but also the full history of the U.S. leading up to the 250th Anniversary. Official meetings will be held at Independence Hall in Philadelphia.

In May 2018, DiLella named Frank Giordano as the commission's executive director. Giordano, who heads Atlantic Trailer Leasing in Philadelphia, led the rejuvenation of the formerly struggling Philly Pops orchestra and was part of the rejuvenation of the prestigious Union League of Philadelphia.

Pennsylvania became the first state to formally begin planning for the anniversary in June 2018 when the commonwealth established the Pennsylvania Semiquincentennial Commission. Four months later, on October 17, Pennsylvania Governor Tom Wolf named Fresh Grocer supermarket magnate and philanthropist Patrick Burns to chair the state commission.

In August 2018, the State of New Jersey launched its effort when New Jersey Governor Phil Murphy signed a measure that called on the New Jersey Historical Commission to create a program focused on the 250th anniversary of the independence of the United States as well as the creation of the state's first Constitution. The law appropriated $500,000 to fund the historical commission's planning for the 250th anniversary festivities.

On November 16, 2018, the 33 members of the United States Semiquincentennial were sworn in at Independence Hall in Philadelphia and convened their first organizing meeting to begin eight years of planning and organizing for the 250th national birthday celebration. Dilella estimated that the group would meet three or four times a year. The new commission consisted of 16 private citizens, including chairman DiLella; eight members of Congress and nine federal officials. The day before the meeting, the Daughters of the American Revolution, in partnership with the commission, held a tree-planting ceremony to introduce its Pathway of the Patriots along the Schuylkill River Trail. Project organizers expect to plant 250 new trees along the trail from the city to Valley Forge.

After being named the non-profit partner in October 2018, the American Battlefield Trust provided financial and staff support to get the Commission operational as well as initial legal support. It convened more than 50 Commission meetings and provided strategic advice for the governance and structure of the Commission, including the establishment of leadership roles and governance committees. The Trust also created the America 250 Foundation and provided initial recommendations for staffing and structure. It helped the Commission develop relationships with key stakeholders and federal agencies, worked to help secure corporate support for the Commission, provided temporary Commission administrative offices and worked with Congress to secure federal appropriations, providing more than 4,200 work hours in these efforts.

In July 2021, the America250 Foundation made public its website as well as its marketing campaign, which initially consisted of advertisements in more than 4,559 locations in the four "leading cities," as well as a public service announcement aired on Comcast NBCUniversal networks that summer. Advertisements were displayed "[from] Times Square and the Lincoln Tunnel in New York to the Walt Whitman Bridge in Philadelphia," with original content also being published on the campaign's social media accounts.

On August 2, 2021, on the 245th anniversary of the starting of the Signing of the United States Declaration of Independence, members of the Semiquincentennial Commission and other federal agencies met at the Thomas Jefferson Building Great Hall of the Library of Congress to sign a memorandum of understanding to further collaborate and coordinate on semiquincentennial activities.

In July 2022, President Joe Biden designated former Treasurer of the United States Rosie Rios as Chair of the U.S. Semiquincentennial Commission. Rios, who replaced Dan DiLella, was first appointed to the Commission on January 11, 2018. DiLella will continue to serve as a commissioner. On Oct. 3, 2022, Rios announced that CEO Joe Daniels had resigned. Daniels, who came from the 9/11 Memorial Museum in New York City, had served as America 250 CEO for one year.

See also
 United States Centennial, 100th anniversary (1876)
 United States Sesquicentennial, 150th anniversary (1926)
 United States Bicentennial, 200th anniversary (1976)
 Founding Fathers of the United States
 United Colonies
 United States Semiquincentennial Commission
 Flagpole of Freedom Park
 George Washington Museum of American History

Notes

References

External links

 Official website of the U.S. Semiquincentennial Commission
 "Leading cities" websites:
 Boston 
 New York City
 Philadelphia
 American Battlefield Trust, secretariat to the United States Semiquincentennial Commission
 Podcast Interview with Landor, Designing the America250 Brand Identity
 Podcast Interview with Anna Laymon, Helping Us Make the Most of the 250th Anniversary of the Declaration of Independence

2026 in the United States
United States Declaration of Independence anniversaries